Zegara zagraea is a moth of the Castniidae family. It is found in Central America and northern South America.

The larvae possibly feed on Aechmea magdalenae.

Subspecies
Zegara zagraea zagraea (Panama, Colombia)
Zegara zagraea salvina (Westwood, 1877) (Panama, Costa Rica)

References

Moths described in 1874
Castniidae